Sandy Bay Soccer Club was a football (soccer) club which represented Sandy Bay in the Tasmanian Southern Premier League from 1922 until its demise in 1953. In their 31-year history Sandy Bay established itself as a powerhouse club of Tasmanian football, winning a remarkable seven state championships, and seven southern premierships which still sees them placed fourth on the winners lists of both competitions despite folding over 50 years ago.

Their great rivalry with neighbours South Hobart was a feature of Tasmanian football competitions before World War II, and their demise was regretted by all associated with the club.

Honours
State Championship: (7 times) 1924,1925,1927,1933,1936,1938,1939
Southern Premierships: (7 times) 1924,1925,1927,1933,1936,1938,1939
Southern Premier Runners-up: (5 times) 1923,1931,1932,1934,1937
Falkinder Cup Winners: (10 times) 1923,1925,1926,1927,1931,1933,1935,1936,1937,1939
Falkinder Cup Runners-up: (4 times) 1929,1930,1934,1946

References 

Association football clubs established in 1922
Defunct soccer clubs in Tasmania
1922 establishments in Australia
1953 disestablishments in Australia
Defunct soccer clubs in Australia